Pasturo (Valassinese ) is a comune (municipality) in the Province of Lecco in the Italian region Lombardy, located about  northeast of Milan and about  north of Lecco.

Pasturo borders the following municipalities: Ballabio, Barzio, Cremeno, Esino Lario, Introbio, Mandello del Lario, Primaluna.

Demographic evolution

References

External links
 www.comune.pasturo.lc.it/

Cities and towns in Lombardy
Valsassina